Qeshlaq-e Qabaleh Gah Abbas Ali (also Romanized as Qeshlāq-e Qabaleh Gāh ʿAbbās ʿAlī) is a village in Qeshlaq-e Gharbi Rural District, Aslan Duz District, Parsabad County, Ardabil Province, Iran. At the 2006 census, its population was 20, in 7 families.

References 

Towns and villages in Parsabad County